Nicholas Huddleston (fl. 1404), of Lincoln, was an English politician.

He was elected Mayor of Lincoln for 1405–06 and a Member (MP) of the Parliament of England for Lincoln in October 1404.

References

14th-century births
15th-century deaths
English MPs October 1404
Members of the Parliament of England (pre-1707) for Lincoln
Mayors of Lincoln, England